The following articles contain information related to ancient humans:
 Human evolution
 Archaic humans
 Early modern humans
 Prehistoric people
 Ancient history

See also 
 :Category:Ancient peoples
 :Category:Lists of ancient people